Edvard Munch is a 1974 biographical film about the Norwegian Expressionist painter Edvard Munch, written and directed by English filmmaker Peter Watkins. It was originally created as a three-part miniseries co-produced by the Norwegian and Swedish state television networks NRK and SVT, but subsequently gained an American theatrical release in a three-hour version in 1976. The film covers about thirty years of Munch's life, focusing on the influences that shaped his art, particularly the prevalence of disease and death in his family and his youthful affair with a married woman. The film was screened at the 1976 Cannes Film Festival, but wasn't entered into the main competition.

Style
Like Watkins' other films, Edvard Munch uses a docudrama approach; scenes from Munch's life are re-enacted by a large cast (mostly Norwegian non-professional actors), but there is also a voiceover narration by Watkins, and there are moments when the characters speak directly to camera, as if being interviewed about their own lives or their opinions of Munch. Some of the dialogue was improvised by the cast, especially in the interview segments. To convey the hostile response Munch's work often received during his lifetime, Watkins recruited Norwegians who genuinely disliked the paintings.

Distribution and responses
After its initial broadcast, the film was briefly an international success but was not widely available for many years afterward. Watkins has said that network officials tried to suppress its distribution, and tried to bar it from competition in the Cannes Film Festival, because they disapproved of its use of non-professional actors and anachronistic dialogue. After NRK relinquished rights to the film in 2002, it gained a wider international release.

Ingmar Bergman called the film a "work of genius".

Cast

Geir Westby as Edvard Munch
Gro Fraas as Fru Heiberg
Johan Halsbog	as Dr. Christian Munch
Lotte Teig as Laura Cathrine Bjølstad
Gro Jarto as Laura Cathrine Munch
Rachel Pedersen as Inger Marie Munch
Berit Rytter Hasle as Laura Munch
Gunnar Skjetne as Peter Andreas Munch
Kare Stormark as Hans Jæger
Eli Ryg as Oda Lasson
Iselin Bast as Dagny Juell
Alf Kåre Strindberg as August Strindberg
Eric Allum as Edvard - 1868
Amund Berge as Edvard - 1875
Kerstii Allum as Sophie - 1868
Inger-Berit Oland as Sophie - 1875
Susan Troldmyr as Laura - 1868
Camilla Falk as Laura - 1875
Ragnvald Caspari as Peter - 1868
Erik Kristiansen as Peter - 1875
Katja Pedersen as Inger - 1868
Anne-Marie Dæhli as Inger - 1875

References

External links
Notes on Edvard Munch on Peter Watkin's website

Stanford Museum document on screening of film

1974 films
1970s biographical drama films
1970s English-language films
Films directed by Peter Watkins
1970s French-language films
1970s Norwegian-language films
Biographical films about painters
Films set in the 1890s
Films set in Norway
Swedish biographical drama films
Norwegian biographical drama films
Cultural depictions of Edvard Munch
Cultural depictions of August Strindberg
1974 drama films
1974 multilingual films
Norwegian multilingual films
Swedish multilingual films
1970s Swedish films